Tanda Naroor is a village in Phagwara in Kapurthala district of Punjab State, India. The village is administrated by Sarpanch an elected representative of the village.

Demography 
, The village has a total number of 17 houses and the population of 92 of which 49 are males while 43 are females.  According to the report published by Census India in 2011, The village does not have any Schedule Caste or Schedule Tribe population so far.

See also
List of villages in India

References

External links 
 Tourism of Punjab
 Census of Punjab

Villages in Kapurthala district